Alexey Yermolov is the name of:
Aleksey Petrovich Yermolov (1772–1861), Russian general and statesman
Alexey Sergeyevich Yermolov (1846–1917), Russian economist, politician and statesman